John Pollington (sometimes shown as John Polentine or Pollentin) was an early Virginia colonist who was a member of the first assembly of the Virginia House of Burgesses at Jamestown, Virginia in 1619 for the "Citie" of Henricus, Virginia. In 1624, he was a burgess for Warrosquyoake Shire sometimes shown as Warresqueak and other variations, now Isle of Wight County, Virginia. He also was a landowner and merchant.

By the date of the Muster Roll of 1624/5 (census), Pollington had moved to Warresqueak with his wife Rachel and with Margaret Polentine, who Martha McCartney surmises was their daughter.

Pollington signed the letter of the governor, councillors and burgesses replying to Alderman Johnson (Alderman [Robert] Johnson), who claimed that the colony thrived in its early years in contrast to the current dire state of the colony.

The list of land patents sent to England in May 1625 showed Pollington with 600 acres of land in Warresqueak.

The Colonial Records for Virginia show:
"July 6, 7, 1626. Examinations of John Preen of London, Merchant aged 36, Thomas Willoughby of Rochester aged 27 and John Pollington of London, Merchant, aged 33. That the only intent of their voyage to Virginia is to carry passengers, goods and munition for the plantation there."

In June 1628, Rachel Pollington was listed as an exporter of tobacco. On February 10, 1629 the General Court decided in a dispute between her and John Moon(e) that she was entitled to the house she occupied, a tobacco house, half the crops and half the land and should lease the other half of the land and other houses on the property to Moone. McCartney states that the date of John Pollington's death is uncertain but the information about Rachel's dealings and property suggest that John Pollington had died by a date in 1628 or 1629.

Footnotes

Citations

References

 “Colonial Records of Virginia”, Volume I. R.F. Walker, Superintendent Public Printing, Richmond, VA: Clemmitt & Jones, Printers, 1874. 
 Haile, Edward Wright, ed. Jamestown Narratives: Eyewitness Accounts of the Virginia Colony: The First Decade: 1607-1617. Champlain, VA: RoundHouse, 1998. .
 Henings, Statutes at Large, shown as Virginia, William Waller Hening, Virginia (Colony). The statutes at large: being a collection of all the laws of Virginia. Volume 1, Richmond, VA: Printed by and for Samuel Pleasants, Junior, printer to the Commonwealth, 1809-1823. . Retrieved July 15, 2011.
 Henry, William Wirt. The First Legislative Assembly in America. In Annual Report of the American Historical Association for the Year 1893. Washington, Government Printing Office, 1894. . Retrieved July 21, 2011.
 McCartney, Martha W. Virginia immigrants and adventurers, 1607-1635: a biographical dictionary. Baltimore: Genealogical Pub. Co., 2007. .
 McIlwaine, H. R. Journals of the House of Burgesses of Virginia, 1619-1658/59. Richmond, VA: The Colonial Press, E. Waddey Co. 1915. .
 Sainsbury, W. N.  Virginia in 1626-27 (Continued) The Virginia Magazine of History and Biography, Published by: Virginia Historical Society, July, 1908, Vol. 16, No. 1, p. 31. Retrieved August 10, 2020.
 Stanard, William G. and Mary Newton Stanard. The Virginia Colonial Register. Albany, NY: Joel Munsell's Sons Publishers, 1902. , Retrieved July 15, 2011.
 Tyler, Lyon Gardiner in Encyclopedia of Virginia biography. New York: Lewis Historical Pub. Co., 1915. . Retrieved July 21, 2011. 

Year of birth unknown
Year of death unknown
House of Burgesses members
American people of English descent
Virginia colonial people
English emigrants
People from Jamestown, Virginia
People from Isle of Wight County, Virginia
American planters